The Poverty Hills are a mountain range in northwestern Inyo County of eastern California, northwest of Bishop and the upper Owens Valley.

They are east of and below the Sierra Nevada, in the Round Valley area, and just west of Tinemaha Reservoir and the Owens River.

References 

Mountain ranges of Northern California
Mountain ranges of the Great Basin
Mountain ranges of Inyo County, California